Marilena Kitromilis (born October 15, 2004) is a Cypriot-American figure skater who represents Cyprus in women's singles skating. She is the 2021 CS Autumn Classic International champion. She is the first Cypriot figure skater to win an ISU-sanctioned international competition.

Personal life 
Kitromilis was born on October 15, 2004, to her Cypriot mother, Maria Kitromilis, and American father, William Adams. She has a twin brother, Mikhail. Though born and raised in the United States, Kitromilis is of Cypriot descent. She traveled to Cyprus multiple times throughout her childhood to spend summers with the families of her grandfather's siblings. Her maternal grandfather was born and raised in Karavas, Cyprus. She is currently a high school student who enjoys reading books of various genres in her free time.

Career

Early years 
Kitromilis started skating on ponds with her mother and twin brother at the age of 2 1/2. She began learn-to-skate classes at four years old with coach Becky Curry and quickly progressed to private lessons with Curry, Juri Litvinov, and Vitaliy Shalin. She competed domestically in the United States at the juvenile through novice levels before transitioning to represent Cyprus, internationally, in advance of the 2020–21 season.

2020–21 season: International senior debut 
Kitromilis made her international senior debut representing Cyprus in October at the 2020 CS Budapest Trophy, where she finished twelfth. She competed at one other international event that season, the 2020 Santa Claus Cup, where she placed sixth. Throughout the 2020–21 season, Kitromilis was in the process of transitioning to a new coaching team from former coaches Mark Mitchell and Peter Johansson.  She is currently coached by Olga Ganicheva, Aleksey Letov, and Sergey Minaev.

2021–22 season: Challenger gold 
Kitromilis opened the Olympic season competing at the Cranberry Cup in mid-August in Norwood, Massachusetts. She placed eighth in the short program and tenth in the free skate to finish eighth overall. At her second assignment of the season, Kitromilis earned her first international title by winning the 2021 CS Autumn Classic International, in what was considered a major upset victory. Kitromilis also scored personal bests in both segments of competition, as well as overall, to win the gold medal ahead of South Korean competitors You Young and Ji Seo-yeon. Kitromilis' scores met the required technical minimums to secure a spot for Cyprus at the 2022 European and World Championships. She is the first-ever Cypriot figure skater to win an ISU-sanctioned international competition.

Kitromilis competed at two more Challenger events in the fall, the 2021 CS Warsaw Cup and the 2021 CS Golden Spin of Zagreb where she finished twelfth and fifth, respectively. In January 2022, Kitromilis made her European Championships debut in Tallinn, Estonia. She finished thirty-second in the short program and did not advance to the free skate. She was thirtieth in the short program at her World Championship debut.

2022–23 season 
Kitromilis began this season with an injury to her left knee. After finishing ninth at the 2022 U.S. Classic, Kitromilis was invited to make her Grand Prix debut. Despite the pain in her knee, she finished eleventh at the 2022 Skate America. At this point, she refocused on the rehab for her injury. Kitromilis then competed at the 2022 CS Warsaw Cup, and the 2022 CS Golden Spin before going to Latvia for the 2022 Latvia Trophy, where she placed third overall. 

The 2023 European Championships proved much more successful for Kitromilis over her debut last year. She finished in eighteenth place after the SP, due to an unfortunate misstep in her footwork. She came back strong in her FS with a season's best score and a top ten placement, to place thirteenth overall. As a result, Kitromilis was invited to perform in the Gala at the 2023 European Championships, which was an honor. A memorable experience for which she was grateful. A week later, Kitromilis was competing at the Bavarian Open 2023, where she placed third overall.

Programs

Competitive highlights 
CS: Challenger Series

For Cyprus

For the United States

Detailed results 
ISU Personal best in bold.

For Cyprus

References

External links
 

2004 births
Living people
American female single skaters
Cypriot female single skaters
American people of Greek Cypriot descent
People from Ipswich, Massachusetts
21st-century American women